Perani's Hockey World is a retail chain founded by Bob Perani in 1976.  They specialize in ice hockey. Indoor, outdoor and street hockey, and also lacrosse.  With a main office in Flint, Michigan, Perani's has 24 stores in North America, with 14 locations in Michigan, 2 in Ohio, and one each in Illinois, Pennsylvania, New York, Tennessee, Indiana, and Texas, with three in Ontario, Canada.

Perani's Hockey World owns the naming rights to Perani Arena and Event Center in Flint, home of the Flint Firebirds, a Junior ice hockey team based in Flint, Michigan. The Firebirds play in the Ontario Hockey League.

References

External links
 Official website

Sporting goods retailers of the United States
Online retailers of the United States
Retail companies established in 1976
1976 establishments in Michigan